Justin Ray Gaethje (born November 14, 1988) is an American professional mixed martial artist. He currently competes in the Lightweight division in the Ultimate Fighting Championship (UFC). He is a former Interim UFC Lightweight Champion. As of May 9, 2022, he is #3 in the UFC lightweight rankings.

Born in Safford, Arizona, Gaethje began wrestling when he was four years old. He was a two-time Arizona state champion as a wrestler at Safford High School, and an NCAA Division I All-American during his time at the University of Northern Colorado. He began his amateur MMA career while in college, turned professional in 2011 and joined the World Series of Fighting (WSOF) in 2013, where he became Lightweight Champion. He defended his WSOF belt five times before vacating it to join the UFC in 2017.

Early life 
Justin Ray Gaethje was born on November 14, 1988, in Safford, Arizona. His mother, Carolina (née Espinoza), is of Mexican descent from Sonora, Mexico  and his father, John Ray Gaethje, is of German descent. His mother was a postmaster while his father was a copper miner, as were both of his grandfathers. His paternal grandfather boxed while serving in the United States Army. Gaethje's father Ray retired as a copper miner in September 2019, after 36 years working at the Morenci mine.

Gaethje has two sisters. He also has a twin brother, Marcus John Gaethje, who worked at the Morenci mine for almost 10 years. When he was 18, Gaethje spent a summer himself at the Morenci mine. He said to Brett Okamoto of ESPN in 2020, "I worked seven days a week, 12 hours every day. I did it for three months straight and took one sick day, because I had to sleep. I did 96 hours one week." Gaethje recalled that as he was about to leave the mine to attend university, two of his co-workers told him, "You'll be right back, you ain't gonna make it in college. You'll be right back here." This motivated Gaethje to make a success of himself.

Wrestling career

High-school
Gaethje began wrestling at the age of four. He attended Safford High School, where he was a four-time finalist and two-time state champion (AIA). He still holds the seventh-most near falls (218) and the ninth-most team points scored (1057.5) in the history of the state as a wrestler. Gaethje also played football and baseball in high school.

Collegiate
Gaethje graduated from Safford High School with a 191–9 record. He initially applied to a small college in Arizona as he wanted to stay close to his family, but instead accepted an offer from the NCAA Division I program at the University of Northern Colorado. As a freshman, Gaethje had an 18–9 record, including a third-place finish at the Oregon Wrestling Classic. In his sophomore season, he qualified for the 2009 NCAA Division I 157 lb Championship, where he posted a 0–2 record. He finished the season with a 14–4 record and was named to the Western Wrestling All-Conference First Team.

As a junior, Gaethje went 5-2 at the 2010 NCAA Division I 157 lb Championship to earn 7th place and All-American status. This made him the first Northern Colorado wrestler to attain Division I All-American status since Larry Wagner in 1970. Gaethje dropped down to the 149 lb division for his senior year, but had struggles with weight cutting. He won true-second at the NCAA Western Regional Championships and so qualified for the 2011 NCAA Division I 149 lb Championship, where he posted a 1–2 record to end his senior season with a 17–8 record.

In June 2020, it was announced that Gaethje would be inducted into the University of Northern Colorado Athletics Hall of Fame for his achievements in wrestling.

Mixed martial arts career

Early career
Gaethje first came into contact with mixed martial arts (MMA) as a freshman at the University of Northern Colorado, when he wrestled Ultimate Fighting Championship (UFC) fighters such as Georges St-Pierre, Clay Guida and future opponent Donald Cerrone. Afterward, he talked to his coaches about his intentions on trying out the new sport, to which he was told that he had to get his grades up in order to get an amateur bout. After improving his grades, Gaethje made his amateur debut during the pre-season of his sophomore year (08'-09') on August 2, 2008, where he scored a slam knockout on his opponent.

After amassing a 7–0 amateur record, Gaethje made his professional debut on August 20, 2011, against future UFC fighter Kevin Croom. Gaethje won the fight in the first round via KO due to a slam after Croom attempted a submission. On the regional circuit in Colorado and Arizona, Gaethje compiled an undefeated 7–0 professional record, with 6 stoppage wins. One of his early victories was over UFC veteran Drew Fickett. Gaethje won by knockout 12 seconds into the first round.

World Series of Fighting
Gaethje was signed by the World Series of Fighting on December 2, 2012, and made his debut on March 23, 2013 at WSOF 2 against Gesias Cavalcante, finishing the fight in the first round through TKO (doctor stoppage) after opening a cut above Cavalcante's left eye.

On June 14, 2013, he fought Brian Cobb at WSOF 3, eventually winning via TKO from leg kicks in the third round.

Afterward, Gaethje fought Dan Lauzon at WSOF 6 on October 26, 2013, finishing Lauzon by knockout with a right uppercut in the second round.

The three stoppage victories secured Gaethje a shot at the inaugural WSOF Lightweight Championship, in the headline bout of WSOF 8 against Richard Patishnock on January 18, 2014. Gaethje dispatched Patishnock in the first round via TKO to become the WSOF Lightweight Champion.

His first title defense was at WSOF 11 against Nick Newell on July 5, 2014. Gaethje won the fight with a right hook TKO in the second round.

On November 15, 2014, Gaethje faced UFC veteran and former training partner Melvin Guillard at WSOF 15. The fight was ruled a non-title contest after Guillard missed weight. He scaled at 158.8 lbs, nearly 4 lbs over the 155 lb limit, and 50% of his purse went to Gaethje. Gaethje won the bout via split decision.

He then went on to fight Luis Palomino at WSOF 19 on March 28, 2015. Gaethje defended his title by stopping Palomino via TKO in the third round after a combination of leg kicks and punches. The Los Angeles Times named this fight as the best fight of 2015.

Gaethje had a rematch against Palomino on September 18, 2015, at WSOF 23 and defended his belt again, finishing Palomino in the second round by TKO.

At WSOF 29 on March 12, 2016, he defended his belt against Brian Foster via TKO due to leg kicks at 1:43 of the first round. Three days later, Gaethje was suspended indefinitely by the Colorado State Athletic Commission for "unsportsmanlike conduct" after he performed his signature celebration, a backflip off the top of the cage, in the aftermath of his victory at WSOF 29. The suspension was lifted a day later.

Gaethje was expected to defend the WSOF Lightweight Championship against Ozzy Dugulubgov at WSOF 33 on October 7, 2016. However, the bout was cancelled on the day of the event as Dugulubgov was stricken with illness.

On October 17, 2016, it was announced that Gaethje would defend the WSOF Lightweight Championship against João Zeferino on December 31, 2016, at WSOF 34 in the main event. However, an injury forced Zeferino to withdraw from the bout and he was replaced by Luiz Firmino. Gaethje won the bout by TKO via doctor stoppage due to Firmino's right eye being swollen after round three.

Ultimate Fighting Championship
On May 4, 2017, Gaethje announced he had vacated his WSOF title and signed with the Ultimate Fighting Championship. It was announced on May 12 that he would make his debut against the veteran Michael Johnson on July 7, at The Ultimate Fighter: Redemption Finale. Gaethje won the back-and-forth fight via TKO in the second round through a combination of punches and knees. The win earned Gaethje the Fight of the Night and Performance of the Night awards. Sherdog named this fight as the best fight of 2017, and round 2 of the fight as the best round of the year.

On July 13, 2017, the UFC announced that Gaethje would coach The Ultimate Fighter 26 along with Eddie Alvarez, with the duo expected to face each other at the conclusion of the season. The bout with Alvarez took place on December 2, 2017, at UFC 218. Gaethje lost the competitive fight by KO in the third round, the first loss of his MMA career. The fight also earned him his second consecutive Fight of the Night bonus award. At the World MMA Awards, it was named the fight of the year. Gaethje said after the loss, "It was the time of my life. Honestly, being in front of that many people, being able to put my skills on the line at the highest level on a pay-per-view, all of those things, it was a dream come true for me. I said it before, I said it many times, that I was going to lose (eventually). If I lost, I hoped that I would get knocked out. All of those things came true."

Gaethje lost a back-and-forth fight via TKO in the fourth round to Dustin Poirier on April 14, 2018, at UFC on Fox 29. The fight earned Gaethje his third consecutive Fight of the Night bonus award. Sherdog named Gaethje vs. Poirier as the best fight of 2018. It was revealed after the fight that Gaethje's leg kicks had caused a partial tear of Poirier's quadriceps femoris muscle. Poirier said, "I didn't know it in the fight, but I knew it the night of and the next morning. He tore my quad. I'm trying to think of another time I've been seriously damaged with kicks. Jim Miller hurt my calf really good, but nothing like that."

Gaethje was scheduled to fight Al Iaquinta on August 25, 2018, at UFC Fight Night 135. However, on June 28, 2018, Iaquinta withdrew from the bout and he was replaced by James Vick. Gaethje rebounded from his two losses in emphatic fashion, winning the fight by knockout in the first round. He was also awarded a Performance of Night award, which meant he had earned five bonus awards in his four fights in UFC.

Gaethje faced Edson Barboza on March 30, 2019, at UFC on ESPN 2. He won the fight via knockout in the first round. This fight earned him the Fight of the Night award.

Gaethje next faced Donald Cerrone on September 14, 2019, in the main event at UFC on ESPN+ 16. He won the fight via TKO in the first round. The win also earned Gaethje his third Performance of the Night bonus award.

UFC interim Lightweight Champion and further title contention
On April 6, it was announced that Gaethje would step in on short notice to face Tony Ferguson for the interim UFC Lightweight Championship on April 18, at UFC 249. However, on April 9, UFC president Dana White announced that this event had been postponed, and the bout instead took place for May 9, 2020. Gaethje dominated the fight, stopping Ferguson via TKO in the fifth round, and thus ending Ferguson's record of 12 wins in a row. He also continued his bonus award streak, earning the Fight of the Night and Performance of the Night awards. This made Gaethje the only fighter in UFC history to win at least one fight night bonus in each of his first seven appearances.

Gaethje fought in a unification bout for the UFC Lightweight Championship against Khabib Nurmagomedov on October 24, 2020, at UFC 254. He lost the fight via technical submission due to triangle choke in the second round, marking the first submission loss in his mixed martial arts career. Despite tapping, referee Jason Herzog did not stop the bout before Gaethje lost consciousness due to the choke.

Gaethje faced former Bellator Lightweight Champion Michael Chandler at UFC 268 on November 6, 2021. After a back-and-forth fight, Gaethje won the bout via unanimous decision despite knocking Chandler down and nearly finishing him in the second round. This bout earned the Fight of the Night award. The bout was named Fight of the Year by various mixed martial arts media outlets and the UFC itself.

Gaethje faced Charles Oliveira on May 7, 2022, at UFC 274 for the vacant UFC Lightweight Championship. Due to Oliveira missing weight and having been stripped of the title, only Gaethje was eligible to win the title. Despite knocking down Oliveira twice, Gaethje lost the fight via rear-naked choke submission in round one.

Gaethje faced Rafael Fiziev on March 18, 2023 at UFC 286. He won the back-and-forth fight via majority decision. This fight earned him the Fight of the Night bonus award.

Fighting style 
As a two-time Arizona State high school champion and an NCAA Division I All-American, Gaethje has some of the best wrestling credentials in the UFC's lightweight division. Despite his elite wrestling pedigree, he rarely looks for takedowns, instead preferring an entertaining stand-up fighting style. He is well known for the knockout power in his punches, and his debilitating leg kicks. When asked after his loss to Poirier in 2018 why he did not use his wrestling in the bout, Gaethje said, "I’ve been wrestling my whole life. I should’ve and could’ve took him down a couple of times, especially when I had him rocked just to steal a round or two. For some reason, my mind will not let me do it. I think I sold myself so hard on the fact that this is not wrestling. It gets you tired. If I’m going to get tired, I’d rather it be from fighting and not from wrestling. That’s the reason why I never wanted to wrestle. But I did so much cardio this camp that it would not have been a problem for me to turn it into a wrestling match, but I just can’t do it, it would not be fun for me."

In a 2020 ESPN interview, Gaethje stated he realized after transitioning from wrestling to mixed martial arts that, while winning was still important, entertaining the fans could earn him more money. He said, "There can be guys out there who are 13–0 with 13 decisions, and they're not [even] getting paid $5,000 to fight because nobody is watching. I've gotten opportunities on the biggest stages because of the way I fight. I've never not wanted to win a belt, but I wanted to make money, and the surest way to make money in this sport was to be exciting." According to Gaethje's coach Trevor Wittman, the back-to-back losses against Alvarez and Poirier caused Gaethje to change his mentality. Although he is still a pressure fighter, Wittman said that Gaethje now takes fewer risks and is more selective about when to trade punches. Wittman stated, "I asked him after those two losses, 'Is your purpose still to be the most exciting fighter in the world?' And he said, 'Not really, Coach. I want to be a UFC champion.'"

Personal life
Gaethje holds a bachelor's degree in Human Services from the University of Northern Colorado. He has stated his intention to do social work with at-risk youth. Gaethje's surname is of German origin due to his German-American father.

Gaethje underwent a photorefractive keratectomy in 2016 to correct his eyesight. He said, "I used to be blind. I had horrible vision. I was 20/60 in one eye and 20/200 in another eye. And I was far sighted in one eye and nearsighted in another eye." Dan Hardy stated on Inside the Octagon that before the surgery Gaethje's "eyesight was so bad that he actually had to physically be in contact with his opponent to know what he was hitting."

Gaethje—along with UFC President Dana White, fighters Colby Covington and Henry Cejudo, and manager Ali Abdelaziz—attended a rally for President Donald Trump in September 2020, with the fighters being acknowledged by the President. Gaethje praised Trump for his role in the UFC's early development, saying "He’s a reason that the UFC is here."

Championships and accomplishments

Wrestling
 National Collegiate Athletic Association
 NCAA Division I All-American out of the University of Northern Colorado (2010)
 2010 NCAA Division I 157 lb Championship – 7th Place

Mixed martial arts
 Ultimate Fighting Championship
 Interim UFC Lightweight Championship (One time)
 Fight of the Night (Seven times) vs. Michael Johnson, Eddie Alvarez, Dustin Poirier, Edson Barboza, Tony Ferguson, Michael Chandler and Rafael Fiziev
 Performance of the Night (Four times)  vs. Michael Johnson, James Vick, Donald Cerrone and Tony Ferguson
 2017 Fight of the Year vs. Michael Johnson
 2021 Fight of the Year vs. Michael Chandler
 Tied (Diego Sanchez, Jim Miller and Joe Lauzon) for fifth most Fight of the Night bonuses in UFC history (7)
 World Series of Fighting
 WSOF Lightweight Championship (One time; first; only)
 Five successful title defenses
 Most consecutive title defenses (five)
 Most wins in title bouts (six)
 Longest lightweight winning streak (10)
 Most knockout wins (nine)
 World MMA Awards
 2017 Fight of the Year vs. Eddie Alvarez at UFC 218
 2017 Comeback of the Year vs. Michael Johnson at The Ultimate Fighter: Redemption Finale
 MMAjunkie
 2015 March Fight of the Month vs. Luis Palomino
 2015 September Fight of the Month vs. Luis Palomino
 2017 Round of the Year vs. Michael Johnson (Round 1)
 2018 Fight of the Year vs. Dustin Poirier
 2021 November Fight of the Month vs. Michael Chandler
 2021 Fight of the Year vs. Michael Chandler
 Yahoo! Sports
 2015 Best Fight of the Half-Year vs. Luis Palomino
 2021 Fight of the Year vs. Michael Chandler
 MMAFighting.com
 2021 Fight of the year vs. Michael Chandler
 Sherdog
 2017 Fight of the Year vs. Michael Johnson
 2017 Round of the Year vs. Michael Johnson (Round 2)
 2018 Fight of the Year vs. Dustin Poirier
 2018 Round of the Year vs. Dustin Poirier (round 2)
 2021 Fight of the Year vs. Michael Chandler
 2021 Round of the Year vs. Michael Chandler (Round 1)
 Bleacher Report
 2017 Fight of the Year vs. Michael Johnson
 2021 Fight of the Year vs. Michael Chandler
 RealSport
 2017 UFC Debut of the Year vs. Michael Johnson
 CBS Sports
 2017 Fight of the Year vs. Michael Johnson
 2021 Fight of the Year vs. Michael Chandler
 Bloody Elbow
 2017 Best Fight of the Year vs. Michael Johnson
 Cageside Press
 2017 Fight of the Year vs. Michael Johnson
 2021 Fight of the Year vs. Michael Chandler
 MMAWeekly.com
 2018 Fight of the Year vs. Dustin Poirier
 CombatPress.com
 2018 Fight of the Year vs. Dustin Poirier
2021 Fight of the Year vs. Michael Chandler
 MMADNA.nl
 2017 Fight of the Year vs. Eddie Alvarez
 2017 Debut of the Year.
 Lowkick MMA
 2021 Fight of the Year vs. Michael Chandler
 Daily Mirror
 2021 Fight of the Year vs. Michael Chandler
Wrestling Observer Newsletter
MMA Match of the Year (2018) 
MMA Match of the Year (2021)

Mixed martial arts record

|-
|Win
|align=center|24–4
|Rafael Fiziev
|Decision (majority)
|UFC 286
|
|align=center|3
|align=center|5:00
|London, England
|
|-
|Loss
|align=center|23–4
|Charles Oliveira
|Submission (rear-naked choke)
|UFC 274
|
|align=center|1
|align=center|3:22
|Phoenix, Arizona, United States
|
|-
|Win
|align=center|23–3
|Michael Chandler
|Decision (unanimous)
|UFC 268
|
|align=center|3
|align=center|5:00
|New York City, New York, United States
|
|-
|Loss
|align=center|22–3
|Khabib Nurmagomedov
|Technical Submission (triangle choke)
|UFC 254
|
|align=center|2
|align=center|1:34
|Abu Dhabi, United Arab Emirates
|
|-
|Win
|align=center|22–2
|Tony Ferguson
|TKO (punch)
|UFC 249
|
|align=center|5
|align=center|3:39
|Jacksonville, Florida, United States
|
|-
|Win
|align=center|21–2
|Donald Cerrone
|TKO (punches)
|UFC Fight Night: Cowboy vs. Gaethje
|
|align=center|1
|align=center|4:18
|Vancouver, British Columbia, Canada
|
|-
|Win
|align=center|20–2
|Edson Barboza
|KO (punch)
|UFC on ESPN: Barboza vs. Gaethje
|
|align=center|1
|align=center|2:30
|Philadelphia, Pennsylvania, United States
|
|-
|Win
|align=center|19–2
|James Vick
|KO (punches)
|UFC Fight Night: Gaethje vs. Vick
|
|align=center|1
|align=center|1:27
|Lincoln, Nebraska, United States
|
|-
|Loss
|align=center|18–2
|Dustin Poirier
|TKO (punches)
|UFC on Fox: Poirier vs. Gaethje
|
|align=center|4
|align=center|0:33
|Glendale, Arizona, United States
|
|-
|Loss
|align=center|18–1
|Eddie Alvarez
|KO (knee)
|UFC 218
|
|align=center|3
|align=center|3:59
|Detroit, Michigan, United States
|
|-
|Win
|align=center|18–0
|Michael Johnson
|TKO (punches and knees)
|The Ultimate Fighter: Redemption Finale
|
|align=center|2
|align=center|4:48
|Las Vegas, Nevada, United States
|
|-
|Win
|align=center|17–0
|Luiz Firmino
|TKO (doctor stoppage)
|WSOF 34
|
|align=center|3
|align=center|5:00
|New York City, New York, United States
|
|-
|Win
|align=center|16–0
|Brian Foster
|TKO (leg kicks)
|WSOF 29
|
|align=center|1
|align=center|1:43
|Greeley, Colorado, United States
|
|-
|Win
|align=center|15–0
|Luis Palomino
|TKO (punches)
|WSOF 23
|
|align=center|2
|align=center|4:30
|Phoenix, Arizona, United States
|
|-
| Win
| align=center| 14–0
| Luis Palomino
| TKO (leg kicks and punches)
| WSOF 19
| 
| align=center| 3
| align=center| 3:57
| Phoenix, Arizona, United States
| 
|-
| Win
| align=center| 13–0
| Melvin Guillard
| Decision (split)
| WSOF 15
| 
| align=center| 3
| align=center| 5:00
| Tampa, Florida, United States
| 
|-
| Win
| align=center| 12–0
| Nick Newell
| TKO (punches)
| WSOF 11
| 
| align=center| 2
| align=center| 3:09
| Daytona Beach, Florida, United States
| 
|-
| Win
| align=center| 11–0
| Richard Patishnock
| TKO (punches and elbows)
| WSOF 8
| 
| align=center| 1
| align=center| 1:09
| Hollywood, Florida, United States
| 
|-
| Win
| align=center| 10–0
| Dan Lauzon
| KO (punches)
| WSOF 6
| 
| align=center| 2
| align=center| 1:40
| Coral Gables, Florida, United States
|
|-
| Win
| align=center| 9–0
| Brian Cobb
| TKO (leg kicks)
| WSOF 3
| 
| align=center| 3
| align=center| 2:19
| Las Vegas, Nevada, United States
|
|-
| Win
| align=center| 8–0
| Gesias Cavalcante
| TKO (doctor stoppage)
| WSOF 2
| 
| align=center| 1
| align=center| 2:27
| Atlantic City, New Jersey, United States
|
|-
| Win
| align=center| 7–0
| Adrian Valdez
| TKO (punches)
| Rage in the Cage 164
| 
| align=center| 2
| align=center| 0:19
| Chandler, Arizona, United States
|
|-
| Win
| align=center| 6–0
| Drew Fickett
| KO (punch)
| Rage in the Cage 163
| 
| align=center| 1
| align=center| 0:12
| Chandler, Arizona, United States
| 
|-
| Win
| align=center| 5–0
| Sam Young
| Submission (rear-naked choke)
| Rage in the Cage 162
| 
| align=center| 2
| align=center| 1:58
| Chandler, Arizona, United States
|
|-
| Win
| align=center| 4–0
| Marcus Edwards
| Decision (unanimous)
| ROF 43: Bad Blood
| 
| align=center| 3
| align=center| 5:00
| Broomfield, Colorado, United States
|
|-
| Win
| align=center| 3–0
| Donnie Bell
| TKO (punches)
| ROF 42: Who's Next
| 
| align=center| 2
| align=center| 2:57
| Broomfield, Colorado, United States
|
|-
| Win
| align=center| 2–0
| Joe Kelso
| TKO (punches)
| BTT MMA 2: Genesis
| 
| align=center| 1
| align=center| 4:32
| Pueblo, Colorado, United States
| 
|-
| Win
| align=center| 1–0
| Kevin Croom
| KO (slam)
| ROF 41: Bragging Rights
| 
| align=center| 1
| align=center| 1:01
| Broomfield, Colorado, United States
| 
|-

NCAA record

! colspan="8"| NCAA Championships Matches
|-
!  Res.
!  Record
!  Opponent
!  Score
!  Date
!  Event
|-
! style=background:white colspan=6 |2011 NCAA Championships at 149 lbs
|-
|Loss
|6–6
|align=left|Scott Sakaguchi
|style="font-size:88%"|SV 6–8
|style="font-size:88%" rowspan=3|March 17, 2011
|style="font-size:88%" rowspan=3|2011 NCAA Division I Wrestling Championship
|-
|Win
|6–5
|align=left|Don Vinson
|style="font-size:88%"|6–4
|-
|Loss
|5–5
|align=left|Ganbayar Sanjaa
|style="font-size:88%"|2–6
|-
! style=background:white colspan=6 |2010 NCAA Championships 7th at 157 lbs
|-
|Win
|5–4
|align=left|Stephen Brown
|style="font-size:88%"|12–7
|style="font-size:88%" rowspan=7|March 19, 2010
|style="font-size:88%" rowspan=7|2010 NCAA Division I Wrestling Championship
|-
|Loss
|4–4
|align=left|Cyler Sanderson
|style="font-size:88%"|6–10
|-
|Win
|4–3
|align=left|Shane Vernon
|style="font-size:88%"|TB 6–5
|-
|Loss
|3–3
|align=left|J.P O’ Connor
|style="font-size:88%"|1–8
|-
|Win
|3–2
|align=left|Matt Moley
|style="font-size:88%"|TB 3–2
|-
|Win
|2–2
|align=left|Bryce Saddoris
|style="font-size:88%"|6–4
|-
|Win
|1–2
|align=left|Hadley Harrison
|style="font-size:88%"|5–4
|-
! style=background:white colspan=6 |2009 NCAA Championships at 157 lbs
|-
|Loss
|0–2
|align=left|Mike Kessler
|style="font-size:88%"|6–11
|style="font-size:88%" rowspan=4|March 19, 2009
|style="font-size:88%" rowspan=4|2009 NCAA Division I Wrestling Championships
|-
|Loss
|0–1
|align=left|Neil Erisman
|style="font-size:88%"|3–8
|-

Pay-per-view bouts

See also
 List of current UFC fighters
 List of male mixed martial artists

References

External links
 
 

1988 births
Living people
American male mixed martial artists
American people of German descent
American mixed martial artists of Mexican descent
Lightweight mixed martial artists
Mixed martial artists utilizing collegiate wrestling
Mixed martial artists from Arizona
Northern Colorado Bears wrestlers
People from Safford, Arizona
Ultimate Fighting Championship male fighters
Ultimate Fighting Championship champions